The National Amusement Park is an amusement park in Ulaanbaatar, Mongolia.

History
The park was opened in 1969.

Architecture
The park includes a castle, roller coaster, games, paddle boats and haunted house. It features an ice skating rink during winter.

See also
 Tourism in Mongolia

References

1969 establishments in Mongolia
Amusement parks opened in 1969
Buildings and structures in Ulaanbaatar
Tourist attractions in Mongolia